Knox Mutizwa (born 12 October 1993) is a Zimbabwean footballer who plays as a striker for Golden Arrows and the Zimbabwe national football team.

International career

International goals
Scores and results list Zimbabwe's goal tally first.

References

External links

1993 births
Living people
Lamontville Golden Arrows F.C. players
South African Premier Division players
Zimbabwean footballers
Zimbabwe international footballers
Association football forwards
2019 Africa Cup of Nations players
Zimbabwe A' international footballers
2016 African Nations Championship players